Turnell is an English toponymic surname. Notable people with the surname include:

 Reg Turnell, English footballer

References